Stoddart is a surname. Notable people with the surname include:

Alexander "Sandy" Stoddart (born 1959), Scottish sculptor
Andrew Stoddart (1863–1915), English cricketer and rugby union player
Cassie Jo Stoddart (1989-2006), American murder victim
Charles Stoddart (1806–1842), British officer and diplomat, who was put to death by the Emir of Bukhara
David Stoddart, Baron Stoddart of Swindon (born 1926), British independent Labour politician 
David Stoddart (geographer) OBE, coral atoll expert
Greta Stoddart (born 1966), English poet
James Fraser Stoddart (born 1942), Scottish chemist
Jennifer Stoddart, Privacy Commissioner of Canada
Jessamy Stoddart (born 1993), English actress
Joseph Stoddart (1932–2019), English anaesthetist 
Joseph Marshall Stoddart (1845–1921), American magazine editor
Margaret Stoddart (1865-1934), New Zealand artist
Morgan Stoddart (born 1984), Welsh rugby union footballer
Paul Stoddart (born 1955), Australian millionaire and owner of the Minardi Formula One racing team
Peter Stoddart (born 1934), English cricketer
Ryley Stoddart (born 1999), Australian rules footballer
Susie Stoddart (born 1982), racing driver from Scotland
Tom Stoddart (1953–2021), British photojournalist
William Stoddart (born 1925), British philosopher
William Lee Stoddart (1868–1940), American architect

in fiction:

Ransom "Rance" Stoddart in the film The Man Who Shot Liberty Vallance

See also
Stoddart Publishing
Stoddart Kids, an imprint of Fitzhenry & Whiteside
Stoddard (disambiguation)
Stodart